Copper phosphate may refer to :

Copper(II) phosphate, cupric salt of phosphoric acid
Copper(I) phosphate, cuprous salt of phosphoric acid
A number of copper phosphate minerals, including :
Turquoise, a hydrated basic copper aluminium phosphate, 
Pseudomalachite, a basic copper phosphate similar in appearance to malachite
Ludjibaite
Reichenbachite
Cornetite, a basic copper phosphate
Libethenite, a rare basic copper phosphate
Sampleite,  a copper phosphate mineral with sodium, calcium, and chlorine counter ions
Tsumebite, a rare lead/copper phosphate/sulfate
Veszelyite, (:de:Veszelyit), a copper/zinc phosphate

See also
Metatorbernite, Torbernite - copper uranyl phosphates
Andrewsite, a discredited copper/iron phosphate, now known to be a mixture
Arthurite, a mixed copper/iron mineral with phosphate/sulphate/arsenate :  CuFe23+(AsO4,PO4,SO4)2(O,OH)2•4H2O.
Copper phosphide